Mariya Mykolenko (born 4 April 1994) is a Ukrainian athlete. She competed in the women's 400 metres hurdles event at the 2020 Summer Olympics.

References

External links
 

1994 births
Living people
Ukrainian female hurdlers
Athletes (track and field) at the 2020 Summer Olympics
Olympic athletes of Ukraine
Place of birth missing (living people)